Tushar Hiranandani (born 13 July) is an Indian film writer. He grew up around the world of films as his grandfather Hiranand Hiranandani and father Ashok Hiranandani were Hindi film distributors and had a company called Black and White film distribution. He tasted early success with his debut film Masti directed by Indra Kumar in 2004. He is the head of content development at Balaji Motion Pictures.

Career

Born in Mumbai, Tushar started out as a clapper boy on the sets of Mann (1999) directed by Indra Kumar. Along with Milap Zaveri, he went on to write films like Kyon Ho Gaya na, Pyaare Mohan and more recently ABCD, Main Tera Hero and Ek Villain. In 2019, Tushar made his directorial debut with the biographical drama Saand Ki Aankh.

Filmography

References

External links
TellyChakker : http://www.tellychakkar.com/movie/movie-news/mohit-sidharth-karan-anil-thadani-do-boys-night-out-415
Indian Express : http://indianexpress.com/article/cities/chandigarh/creating-money-spinners/
Bollywood Hungama : http://www.bollywoodhungama.com/movies/features/type/view/id/5651

Living people
Indian male screenwriters
Screenwriters from Mumbai
Sindhi people
1975 births